Josef Ezr (3 October 1923 – 2 November 2013) was a Czech basketball player. He was voted to the Czechoslovakian 20th Century Team in 2001.

National team career
With the senior Czechoslovakian national team, Ezr competed in the men's tournament at the 1948 Summer Olympics, and the 1952 Summer Olympics. With Czechoslovakia, he also won the gold medal at the 1946 EuroBasket, and the silver medal at the 1947 EuroBasket.

References

External links
FIBA Profile 1
FIBA Profile 2

1923 births
2013 deaths
Czech men's basketball players
Olympic basketball players of Czechoslovakia
Basketball players at the 1948 Summer Olympics
Basketball players at the 1952 Summer Olympics
Sportspeople from Prague